Gerasimos Skiadaresis (born 18 December 1960) is a Greek actor.  He also worked in theatre in E. Chatzikou School which he began in 1982.  He is married to the actress Bessie Malfa.

Theatre

La Moschetta
A play from Molière
Louves
Oleanna (David Mamet)
I stella me ta kokkina gantia (Η Στέλλα με τα κόκκινα γάντια = Stella With Red Gloves, by Iakavos Kabanellis)
After the Rain

Filmography

Television

External links
 

1960 births
Living people
Greek male actors
21st-century Greek male actors
20th-century Greek male actors
Actors from Patras